The central Sulawesi echiothrix (Echiothrix centrosa) is a species of rodent in the family Muridae. It is found only in Sulawesi, Indonesia.

References

Further reading

New species and records of fur mites (Acari: Astigmata: Atopomelidae) from Southeast Asian rodents (Rodentia: Muridae).
Musser, G. G. 1990. "Sulawesi Rodents: Species Traits and Chromosomes of Haeromys minahassae and Echiothrix leucura (Muridae: Murinae)". American Museum Novitates 2989:1–18. 

Sulawesi spiny rat, Central
Sulawesi spiny rat, Central
Rodents of Sulawesi
Vulnerable fauna of Asia
Taxa named by Ned Hollister
Taxa named by Gerrit Smith Miller Jr.
Mammals described in 1921
Echiothrix